The 2011 Karjala Tournament was played between 10–13 November 2011. The Czech Republic, Finland, Sweden and Russia played a round-robin for a total of three games per team and six games in total. Five of the matches were played in the Hartwall Areena in Helsinki, Finland, and one match in the Fjällräven Center in Örnsköldsvik, Sweden. The tournament was won by Russia, who won all their three games. The tournament was part of 2011–12 Euro Hockey Tour.

Standings

Games
All times are local (UTC+2 for the games in Finland, and UTC+1 for the game in Sweden).

Scoring leaders
GP = Games played; G = Goals; A = Assists; Pts = Points; +/− = Plus/minus; PIM = Penalties in minutes; POS = PositionSource: Swehockey

Goaltending leaders
TOI = Time on ice (minutes:seconds); SA = Shots against; GA = Goals against; GAA = Goals against average; Sv% = Save percentage; SO = ShutoutsSource:

Tournament awards
Best players selected by the directorate:
Best Goalkeeper:  Konstantin Barulin
Best Defenceman:  Ilya Nikulin
Best Forward:  Jarkko Immonen
Top Scorer:  Alexander Radulov (4 goals, 1 assist)

Tournament All-Star Team selected by the media:
Goaltender:  Konstantin Barulin
Defencemen:  Ilya Nikulin,  Sami Vatanen
Forwards:  Mikael Granlund,  Jarkko Immonen,  Alexander Radulov

References

2011–12 Euro Hockey Tour
2011–12 in Swedish ice hockey
2011–12 in Russian ice hockey
2011–12 in Finnish ice hockey
2011–12 in Czech ice hockey

Karjala Tournament
2011
November 2011 sports events in Europe
2010s in Helsinki
Sports competitions in Örnsköldsvik